Ariel Hernández may refer to:

Ariel Hernández (boxer), Cuban boxer
Ariel Hernández (singer), American singer in No Mercy
Ariel Hernández (baseball), Baseball player